Nicola Stefanelli (born 14 April 1997) is an Italian professional footballer who plays as a defender.

Club career
He made his Serie C debut for Mestre on 8 October 2017 in a game against FeralpiSalò.

On 11 July 2018, he joined Serie C side AlbinoLeffe.

For 2019–20 season, he joined Modena.

On 5 January 2021, he moved to Legnago.

References

External links
 
 

1997 births
Living people
Sportspeople from Padua
Italian footballers
Association football defenders
Serie C players
Virtus Entella players
A.C. Renate players
A.S. Gubbio 1910 players
A.C. Mestre players
U.C. AlbinoLeffe players
Modena F.C. players
F.C. Legnago Salus players
Footballers from Veneto